Archaeotypotherium is an extinct genus of notoungulate belonging to the family Archaeohyracidae that lived during the Oligocene of Argentina and Chile. It was first described in 1903 by the Argentine paleontologist Santiago Roth.

References

Typotheres
Oligocene mammals of South America
Paleogene Argentina
Fossils of Argentina
Paleogene Chile
Fossils of Chile
Deseadan
Tinguirirican
Fossil taxa described in 1903
Prehistoric placental genera
Sarmiento Formation
Golfo San Jorge Basin